Altamira Fútbol Club, or Estudiantes de Altamira (previously known as Estudiantes de Santander) was a Mexican football team that was based in Altamira, Tamaulipas.

History
On July 12, 2001, the expansion club Estudiantes de Santander announced an open try-out that was attended by hundreds of youths in Tamaulipas, wishing to form part of the club that would begin play in the Segunda División de México (Second Division). The club was officially founded on August 11, 2001. During the 2004-05 season, the club was promoted to the Primera A (now Liga de Ascenso), where they became a farm team to San Luis and later, Pumas UNAM. But their stay in the Primera A was short, and they were eventually relegated back to the Second Division after the Clausura 2005 tournament.

In 2006, the team changed its name to Estudiantes de Altamira.

It was almost five years before Altamira returned to the Liga de Ascenso in 2010. This, because the teams that reached the Segunda Division championship that year (Universidad del Futbol and Chivas Rayadas, respectively) did not have the right to be promoted. So, Estudiantes de Altamira took their place.

Disappearance
After unsuccessful seasons in the Ascenso MX, on May 25, 2015 Altamira moved to Chiapas and change its franchise to Cafetaleros de Tapachula after facing economic struggles due to their low attendance.

Team crest and colors
The team crest represents the important resources in and around the port city of Altamira (the anchor, the ship, and the factories). In the foreground, there is a ship's steering wheel. The navy blue and white colors symbolize the waters of the Gulf of Mexico.

Notable players
  Esteban Alberto González
  Patrick da Silva
  Juliano de Andrade
  Lucas Silva
  William
  Nelson San Martín
  Jairo Martínez
  David Toledo
  Hector del Angel
  Horacio Sánchez
  Pedro Solís
  Franz Torres
  Sony Norde
  Jonathan Jáuregui

References

External links
 

Defunct football clubs in Tamaulipas
Association football clubs established in 2001
Ascenso MX teams
2001 establishments in Mexico